"Ligeia" is a short story by Edgar Allan Poe.

Ligeia may also refer to:

 Ligeia (band), a metalcore band
 Ligeia (mythology), a siren in Greek mythology
 Ligeia Mare, the second-largest lake on Saturn's moon Titan (named after the siren)
 "Ligeia", a song from the thrash metal band Annihilator (band)
 "Ligeia", a song from the alternative band Bedlight for Blue Eyes

See also
 Ligeia Siren, a chalk drawing by Dante Gabriel Rossetti
 The Tomb of Ligeia, a 1964 British film
 Ligia
 Ligia (name)